Luis Enrique Delgado Mantilla (born October 26, 1980) is a Colombian football goalkeeper. He currently plays for Deportivo Pasto in Categoría Primera A.

Trajectory

Millonarios FC
By early 2010, Delgado was named for Millonarios FC to be the second goalkeeper, but because of the bad work of one goalkeeper of the Bogota club, Juan Obelar, received the opportunity and he stayed with the job demonstrating great condition and earning the affection of the fans albiazul. Game after game was the figure of the court in a way sorprendente so much so that critics considered him one of the best goalkeepers in the local championship  and postulated to be summoned to the Colombia national team.

With the arrival of Nelson Ramos in 2011 the ambassador team, Delgado was relegated to backup job without this decimated their effort and commitment to the club. In 2012, he alternated in the bow participating in the tournament Copa Colombia during the first half. In the second tournament of the year, before the injury Achilles tendon rupture the goalkeeper, Nelson Ramos Delgado was a starter again, disputing parties both local tournament Categoría Primera A as the Copa Sudamericana, doing a remarkable job in the table achieved the semifinals of the continental tournament and the Star League 14 blue eleventh.

For the same period, his wife Tatiana is valued medically with breast cancer, so the keeper decides to wear a haircut (shaved) in support of women with this disease. Similarly, Delgado spent all season, and eventually the title, in Colombia women with cancer.

That was how the December 16, 2012, he won the Colombian professional title 2012 Categoría Primera A season with the shirt of Millonarios beating Medellín in a final that was defined in criminal and where Delgado scored the last penalty to Millonarios and interrupted the penalty that ultimately would give the team championship Bogotá.

By the end of 2014, he was widely criticized for errors in games, so for the 2015 lost the title with the keeper Nicolas Vikonis acting alone in the Copa Colombia.

Statistics (Official games/Colombian Ligue and Colombian Cup)
(As of November 14, 2010)

References

External links

1980 births
Living people
Colombian footballers
Categoría Primera A players
Categoría Primera B players
Alianza Petrolera players
Atlético Bucaramanga footballers
Real Cartagena footballers
Real Santander footballers
Millonarios F.C. players
Cúcuta Deportivo footballers
Deportes Tolima footballers
Águilas Doradas Rionegro players
Deportivo Pasto footballers
Association football goalkeepers
People from Bucaramanga
Sportspeople from Santander Department